Salimu Khamis Aiyee (born 5 May 1996) is a Tanzanian football striker who plays for KMC.

References

1996 births
Living people
Tanzanian footballers
Tanzania international footballers
Mwadui United F.C. players
Kinondoni Municipal Council F.C. players
Association football forwards
Tanzanian Premier League players